Hydrelia rubricosta is a moth in the family Geometridae first described by Hiroshi Inoue in 1982. It is found in Nepal and China.

References

Moths described in 1982
Asthenini
Moths of Asia